Doc Marshall may refer to:
Doc Marshall (catcher) (1875–1959), American baseball catcher who played between 1904 and 1909
Doc Marshall (infielder) (1906–1999), American baseball infielder who played between 1929 and 1932